Sam Roberts (born June 20, 1947) is an American journalist who has written for The New York Times since 1983, serving as Urban Affairs Correspondent from 2005 to 2015. He now serves as an obituaries writer.  He is also host of the NY1 show The New York Times Close Up.

Career
Roberts graduated from Cornell University in 1968, where he was managing editor of The Cornell Daily Sun and a member of the Quill and Dagger society. He was city editor at the New York Daily News from 1977 to 1981 and political editor from 1981 to 1983, when he joined The New York Times.

Bibliography

References

External links

Sam Roberts at Macmillan Publishers
Sam Roberts at The New York Times

1947 births
Living people
The New York Times writers
Cornell University alumni
People from Brooklyn
New York Daily News people
Editors of New York City newspapers
American male journalists
Obituary writers